Gonzalo Sánchez de Somoza Quiroga (1575 – 14 August 1644) was a Roman Catholic prelate who served as Bishop of Mondoñedo (1638–1644).

Biography
Gonzalo Sánchez de Somoza Quiroga was born in Santa María de Ferreira, Spain. On 21 June 1638, he was selected by the King of Spain and confirmed by Pope Urban VIII as Bishop of Mondoñedo. On 23 January 1639, he was consecrated by Fernando Andrade Sotomayor, Archbishop of Burgos with Bartolomé Santos de Risoba, Bishop of León, and Cristóbal Guzmán Santoyo, Bishop of Palencia, serving as co-consecrators. He served as Bishop of Mondoñedo until his death on 14 August 1644. While bishop, he served as the primary co-consecrator of Diego Martínez Zarzosa, Bishop of Tui (1644).

References 

1575 births
1644 deaths
17th-century Roman Catholic bishops in Spain
Bishops appointed by Pope Urban VIII